Euchroite is a hydrated copper arsenate hydroxide mineral with formula: Cu2AsO4OH·3H2O. It is a vitreous green to emerald green mineral crystallizing in the orthorhombic system. It has a Mohs hardness of 3.5 - 4.0 and a specific gravity of 3.39 - 3.45. It was first described in 1823 in Ľubietová, Slovakia.

References

External links

Mindat localities
Webmineral

Copper(II) minerals
Arsenate minerals
Orthorhombic minerals
Minerals in space group 19